Nand is a Pakistani soap series aired on ARY Digital from 4 August 2020 to 13 April 2021. It is produced by Fahad Mustafa under Big Bang Entertainment. It stars Javeria Saud, Minal Khan, Aijaz Aslam and Shahroz Sabzwari and Faiza Hasan.

Plot
Nand  is a drama surrounded by emotions. The story revolves around family issues. Saqib is the younger brother of Gohar and the husband of Rabi. Gohar cannot stand Rabi in her brother's life. She creates issues in their married life. Jahangir is the brother-in-law of Saqib and husband of Gohar that later marries Rabi.

Cast
 Faiza Hasan/Javeria Saud as Gohar
 Minal Khan as Rabi 
 Shehroz Sabzwari as Saqib
 Aijaz Aslam as Jahangir
 Sumbul Shahid as Nasreen (dead)
 Ayaz Samoo as Hasan
 Minsa Malik as Afshan
 Aamna Malick as Gul Rukh, Hasan's second wife
 Saima Qureshi as Naima, Gul Rukh's mother
 Tipu Shareef as Rabi's brother (dead)
 Mehwish Qureshi as Muneeza Bhabhi, Rabi's sister-in-law
 Maha Hasan as Farwa, Hasan's ex-wife
 Hamzah Tariq Jamil as Shahzaib
 Mahrunisa Iqbal as Sundas
 Anosha Ali as Ramsha
 Nabeela Khan as Amna, Sundas's mother
 Kamran Jilani as Dilawar Ali Shah, Gohar's husband
 Mirza Rizwan Nabi as Khurram, Sundus's husband

Production
Previously titled , the serial was first announced by Khan through her instagram account in February 2020.

The television series was first planned to be a 30 episode finite series and was supposed to air on the 8PM prime time slot but few months before airing the channel shifted the serial to a Soap drama airing 4 days a week (Mon-Thurs 7PM).

The first teaser of the series was released on 25 July 2020.

Due to extraordinary response, the serial was extended and the cast came back to shooting to start the extension storyline. However, Faiza Hassan quit the series and then the makers decided to call her for a small cameo role to grandly end her role. Faiza Hassan was later replaced by Javeria Saud, who played Nand in the extension storyline. Minal Khan also quit the serial due to her father's death but her character wasn't replaced, it was simply sidelined.

In March 2021, it was announced that the series will go off air before Ramadan 2021 and the last episode will be air on 13 April 2021.

Reception 
Nand opened up with average ratings around 2.5 but soon increased to 4.0. Gradually, the ratings increased and had reached TRPs of 10 and higher. It was also criticised for its over-melodramatic story and re-entry of the main protagonist after plastic surgery.

The high ratings continued for the serial in 2020 and early 2021, however in February 2021 ratings declined slowly due to excessive dragging in the storyline but the serial still managed to keep its position as slot leader.

Awards and nominations

Lux Style Awards

ARY People's Choice Awards

References

Pakistani drama television series
ARY Digital original programming
2020 Pakistani television series debuts
Urdu-language television shows